Scythris biskraensis is a moth of the family Scythrididae. It was described by Bengt Å. Bengtsson in 1997. It is found in Algeria.

References

biskraensis
Moths described in 1997